Thirumalai Engineering College is an engineering college located in Kilambi, Kanchipuram, Tamil Nadu, India. The college is affiliated with Anna University, Chennai.

History
Thirumalai Engineering College was established in 1999. The college is approved by the All India Council for Technical Education (AICTE) and affiliated with Anna University, Chennai. The college provide bachelor degree courses and diploma courses in engineering.

Facilities
 Laboratories
 Computer Center
 Library
 Auditorium
 Hostel
 Transport facilities
 Sports Complex

References

External links
 

Engineering colleges in Chennai
Colleges affiliated to Anna University
Educational institutions established in 1999
Kanchipuram
1999 establishments in Tamil Nadu